The Globular Flute (Macedonian: Топчеста Флејта; Latinic: Topchesta flejta) is a Neolithic ocarina-type flute found in 1989 at the Mramor archaeological site near Čaška village, 15 km north of Veles in North Macedonia.

The artefact is an irregular spherical object made of refined reddish clay, with a diameter of 4.7 cm and a hollow interior. The surface of the object is without any decorative elements. The object is pierced with three holes with different diameters (0.4 cm and 0.6 cm), arranged like the apexes of a triangle. The hole positioned at one corner of the triangle is wider than the other two, which are identical. The object has been identified as a musical instrument by the excavators, an ocarina-type globular flute.

The flute has no find context, having been discovered in a ploughed field, but the date of the Neolithic settlement at Mramor ranges from between 5000 and 4000 BC. Although a unique object, experts consider it to be a demonstration of the type of technology available in Neolithic Europe. It is not known if the flute was for performing ritual music or for entertainment, but experiments have been carried out on the melodies produced by the instrument by musician Dragan Dautovski who has played a glass reproduction of the Mramor flute, revealing possible Neolithic melodic registers and scales. Dautovski has said that the timbre of the flute is "almost shocking", and the instrument is "a testimonial to the divine power of music as the oldest cosmic language".

References

Further reading
 Perono Cacciafoco, Francesco. (2019). A Prehistoric 'Little Goose': A New Etymology for the Word 'Ocarina'. Annals of the University of Craiova: Series Philology, Linguistics, XLI, 1-2: 356-369, Paper.

Links
 YouTube videos of Dragan Dautovski playing a replica of the Mramor globular flute: , 
 Getty Images 2007 photograph of Dragan Dautovski holding the flute: 

Ancient music
Neolithic
Čaška Municipality